Mount Aniakchak is a 3,700-year-old volcanic caldera approximately  in diameter, located in the Aleutian Range of Alaska, United States. Although a stratovolcano by composition, the pre-existing mountain collapsed in a major eruption forming the caldera. The area around the volcano is the Aniakchak National Monument and Preserve, maintained by the National Park Service. In November 1967, Aniakchak Caldera was designated as a National Natural Landmark by the National Park Service.

Geological history
Andesitic material in the volcano included basalt and dacite. The mountain collapsed, forming the present day caldera, during a major eruption of VEI=6, which left evidence in ice cores dated to 1645 BC. which was later moved to 1641 BC in the Greenland Ice Core Chronology 2005 (GICC05) time scale. Recently, McAneney and Baillie have suggested that the GICC05 ice core dates in the 17th century BC may be around 14 years too old, meaning that Aniakchak actually erupted in 1628 or 1627 BC.

Since then, more than 20 eruptions have occurred from vents on the caldera floor. Vent Mountain has been the source of numerous eruptions of ash, bombs, and lava flows since the caldera formed. From 1500 BC to AD 1000 four lava domes were extruded on the caldera floor. Textural evidence shows that these lava-dome eruptions occurred beneath Ancient Surprise Lake which was as deep as 100m. Ancient Surprise Lake drained catastrophically before about AD 1000. (Surprise Lake (Aniakchak's crater lake) is now about 2.75 km2 (680 acres) in area and up to 19.5 m (64.0 ft) deep.) Before or immediately after this draining, explosive eruptions of andesitic magma produced a cluster of three tuff cones in the southeast part of the caldera.

Around AD 1500, during one of the most violent events in recent history at Aniakchak, an estimated 0.75 to 1.0 km3 of material destroyed a preexisting edifice at Half Cone and flooded most of the caldera floor with pyroclastic flows, surges, and fallout many meters thick. During the final phase of this eruption, a lava flow filled the basin formed during the collapse of Half Cone.

Several more recent prehistoric eruptions occurred in the summit crater and along the south flank of Vent Mountain producing a field of blocky dacite lava flows against the south wall of the caldera. Minor eruptions immediately west and east of Vent Mountain produced a small scoria cone (Blocky Cone) and two maar craters (now water-filled) along the base of the southeast caldera wall.

European-descended geologists discovered the volcano in 1922.

The volcano's only eruption in modern recorded history occurred in 1931. The Jesuit "Glacier Priest", Father Bernard Hubbard, made record of it: "A small but impressive explosion pit was added to the pockmarked caldera floor that year. Many thousands of tons of ash lay strewn within the caldera and scattered up to 40 miles away over the small villages".

Human history 
The caldera-forming eruptions of ~3,700 years ago had a significant effect on the regional landscape, and on the entire range of plant and animal life over a broad area. Indeed, the eruption has been implicated in widespread impacts on human populations across the whole of western Alaska. In the immediate vicinity of the volcano, the effects were so severe that people did not return to the region for another 2,000 years. Some scholars speculate that this eruption (and the subsequent devastation) may have segregated people to the north and south of the volcano for long enough to drive the divergence between Aleutian and Eskimo (Inuit-Yupik) languages.

Surprise Lake
Surprise Lake within the caldera is the source of the Aniakchak River, a National Wild River.

See also
 List of National Natural Landmarks
 List of volcanoes in the United States

References

External links
 Alaska Peninsula Trek
 Alaska Volcano Observatory
 Volcanoes of the Alaska Peninsula and Aleutian Islands-Selected Photographs

Active volcanoes
Aleutian Range
Volcanic crater lakes
Volcanoes of Lake and Peninsula Borough, Alaska
National Natural Landmarks in Alaska
Subduction volcanoes
VEI-6 volcanoes
Calderas of Alaska
Volcanoes of Alaska
Stratovolcanoes of the United States
Holocene calderas